Dangerous Venture is a 1947 American Western film directed by George Archainbaud and written by Doris Schroeder. The film stars William Boyd, Andy Clyde, Rand Brooks, Fritz Leiber, Douglas Evans and Harry Cording. The film was released on May 23, 1947, by United Artists.

Plot
This movie was a western based cowboy and indians movies. It included the traditional idea of indians and cow boys fighting against each other over taken land. William Boyd played a risk-taking cowboy who was going to avenge the death of his family due to the aggravated aggression of the natives. this movie is action packed and highly considered a classic.

Cast 
 William Boyd as Hopalong Cassidy
 Andy Clyde as California Carlson
 Rand Brooks as Lucky Jenkins
 Fritz Leiber as Chief Xeoli
 Douglas Evans as Dr. Grimes Atwood
 Harry Cording as Dan Morgan
 Betty Alexander as Dr. Sue Harmon
 Francis McDonald as Henchman Kane
 Neyle Morrow as Jose
 Patricia Tate as Talu
 Bob Faust as Henchman Stark
 Kenneth Tobey as Red
 Jack Quinn as The Marshal
 Bill Nestell as Pete, the Cook

References

External links 
 
 
 
 

1947 films
American black-and-white films
Films directed by George Archainbaud
United Artists films
American Western (genre) films
1947 Western (genre) films
Hopalong Cassidy films
1940s English-language films
1940s American films